Government Medical College, Patiala, is the second-oldest medical college in the state of Punjab, in India.

History

Government Medical College, Patiala was proposed in October 1951 by the Patiala and East Punjab States Union government, under the First Five-Year Plan. The first batch was started on 29 September 1953. The classes initially started from the old building of the Rajindar Hospital, which later shifted to the Archives Department, located on The Mall Road, opposite the Giani Gurmukh Singh Musafir Memorial Central State Library (earlier known as the Rajindar Victoria Diamond Jubilee Library), about 2 kilometers from its current location. With the construction of the new Rajendra Hospital in 1953 the old hospital building was made available to house some of the offices of the PEPSU state.

Currently the Archives Department is housed in the old Rajindar Hospital. The old Rajindar Hospital is a building outside the old town opposite the Baradari. The old Rajindar Hospital was a building with 56 beds, built in the time of the second Council of Regency in 1877. It was formally opened in January 1883. A thoroughly modern operation room was added to the building by Maharaja Rajindar Singh. The Dufferin Hospital close by the Rajindar Hospital was also built in the time of the second Council of Regency, the foundation stone having been laid in November 1888 and the building opened in October 1890. An Assistant Surgeon lent by the Government of the Punjab held charge of the Rajindar Hospital and was also Civil Surgeon of Patiala. Attached to the Rajindar Hospital was the female hospital (Lady Dufferin Hospital now known as Mata Kaushalya Hospital) under the charge of a Medical Lady Superintendent.

The hospital is named after Maharaja Sir Rajinder Singh and it receives a notable mention in 1908 by The Imperial Gazetteer of India as the Rajindar Hospital. The hospital was known as Rajindar Hospital in pre-independence era, was mentioned as Rajendra Hospital for some time, and currently uses the name Rajindra Hospital.

With its attached 1009-bed Rajindra Hospital + 121-bed TB hospital is one of the largest health institutions in the region.

The attached central clinical laboratory with facilities for hematology, pathology, microbiology, biochemistry is known as Bhupindra Clinical Laboratory.

Location and campus 

The college consists of an administrative block and self-contained blocks for the basic clinical departments. The college maintains a library, computer centre and a reading room for the use of students and staff members.

Affiliated hospitals 

Rajindra Hospital, Patiala with 1009 beds was attached to the college in early 1951. The hospital was equipped with all the latest apparatus and instruments to make it fit for imparting clinical teaching to the students. Two well designed, spacious and well lighted lecture theatres equipped with arrangements for epidiascopes projections and audio visual aids were provided on the hospital side in addition to four lecture theatres of similar design on college side for  basic departments.

The department of Tuberculosis and Respiratory Medicine/Pulmonary Medicine is located in a separate campus, known as the Tuberculosis Centre, Patiala which started functioning on 25 July 1953 with 22 observation beds, 11 for male and 11 for female patients with Tuberculosis. It is popularly known as TB Hospital or Padma Shri Dr.Khushdeva Singh Chest Diseases Hospital, and currently has a capacity of 121 beds. Primary health centres at Bhadson, Kauli and Tripuri are attached with this college for teaching purposes.

There are three hostels, two for girls and one for boys. In addition to this there is one hostel in the Rajindra Hospital also for Doctors/Interns/House surgeons. The college has a very spacious auditorium, big play ground and an open-air theatre.

The college is governed by Director Research and Medical Education, Punjab and is affiliated to Baba Farid University of Health Sciences, Faridkot.

University 

Govt. Medical College Patiala is affiliated to Baba Farid University of Health Sciences Faridkot, Established in the memory of great Sufi Saint Baba Farid by Punjab government in July, 1900 by an Act of the State Legislature, which was established in 1999.

Courses offered 

 Bachelor of Medicine and Bachelor of Surgery (MBBS) (5½ years course including 1-year internship) 225 seats
 Doctor of Medicine (MD) and Master of Surgery (MS)
Diploma in Anaesthesia (DA)
 Bachelor of Science in Nursing (B.Sc. Nursing)
 Bachelor of Science in Medical Laboratory technology (B.Sc.MLT)
 Bachelor of Science in anatomy, physiology and biochemistry (B.Sc. Medical)
 Master of Science in anatomy, physiology and biochemistry (M.Sc. Medical)
 Diploma in pharmacy (D.Pharma.)
 Diploma in medical laboratory technology (DMLT)
 Diploma in radiography (DR)
 Doctor of Philosophy (PhD)

Notable physicians
 Khushdeva Singh
 Sohan Hayreh

References

External links
 

Medical colleges in Punjab, India
Education in Patiala
1951 establishments in East Punjab
Educational institutions established in 1951